Korek Telecom is an Iraqi Kurdish mobile phone operator company in Erbil, Kurdistan Region. 

In March 2011, France Télécom (now Orange S.A.) acquired a 20% indirect stake in Korek Telecom.

On Jan 1, 2015, Korek launched 3G in Iraq after winning one of the three 3G licenses awarded by Government of Iraq

On Dec 16, 2015, Korek became the first operator in Iraq to launch Free Basics in Iraq in partnership with Internet.org and Facebook.

See also
Asiacell
Zain Iraq
Telephone numbers in Iraq

References

External links 
 

Mobile phone companies of Iraq
Orange S.A.
Erbil Governorate
Telecommunications companies established in 2000
2000 establishments in Iraqi Kurdistan
Iraqi brands
Iraqi companies established in 2000